The Federal Reserve System (also known as "the Fed") has faced various criticisms since it was authorized in 1913. Nobel laureate economist Milton Friedman and his fellow monetarist Anna Schwartz criticized the Fed's response to the Wall Street Crash of 1929 arguing that it greatly exacerbated the Great Depression. More recent prominent critics include former Congressman Ron Paul.

Creation

An early version of the Federal Reserve Act was drafted in 1910 on Jekyll Island, Georgia, by Republican Senator Nelson Aldrich, chairman of the National Monetary Commission, and several Wall Street bankers. The final version, with provisions intended to improve public oversight and weaken the influence of the New York banking establishment, was drafted by Democratic Congressman Carter Glass of Virginia. The structure of the Fed was a compromise between the desire of the bankers for a central bank under their control and the desire of President Woodrow Wilson to create a decentralized structure under public control.  The Federal Reserve Act was approved by Congress and signed by President Wilson in December 1913.

Inflation policy
In The Case Against the Fed, Murray Rothbard argued in 1994 that, although a supposed core function of the Federal Reserve is to maintain a low level of inflation, its policies (like those of other central banks) have actually aggravated inflation. This occurs when the Fed creates too much fiat money backed by nothing. He called the Fed policy of money creation "legalized counterfeiting" and favored a return to the gold standard. He wrote:

Effectiveness and policies 
The Federal Reserve has been criticized as not meeting its goals of greater stability and low inflation. This has led to a number of proposed changes including advocacy of different policy rules or dramatic restructuring of the system itself.

Milton Friedman concluded that while governments do have a role in the monetary system he was critical of the Federal Reserve due to its poor performance and felt it should be abolished. Friedman believed that the Federal Reserve System should ultimately be replaced with a computer program. He favored a system that would automatically buy and sell securities in response to changes in the money supply. This proposal has become known as Friedman's k-percent rule.

Others have proposed NGDP targeting as an alternative rule to guide and improve central bank policy. Prominent supporters include Scott Sumner, David Beckworth, and Tyler Cowen.

Congress
Several members of Congress have criticized the Fed. Senator Robert Owen, whose name was on the Glass-Owen Federal Reserve Act, believed that the Fed was not performing as promised. He said: The Federal Reserve Board was created to control,  regulate and stabilize credit in the interest of all people. . . . The Federal Reserve Board is the most gigantic financial power in all the world. Instead of using this great power as the Federal Reserve Act intended that it should, the board . . . delegated this power to the banks."Owen criticises reserve board", The New York Times (July 25, 1921) 

Representative Louis T. McFadden, Chairman of the House Committee on Banking and Currency from 1920 to 1931, accused the Federal Reserve of deliberately causing the Great Depression. In several speeches made shortly after he lost the chairmanship of the committee, McFadden claimed that the Federal Reserve was run by Wall Street banks and their affiliated European banking houses. In one 1932 House speech (that has been criticized as bluster), he stated: 

Many members of Congress who have been involved in the House and Senate Banking and Currency Committees have been open critics of the Federal Reserve, including Chairmen Wright Patman, Henry Reuss, and Henry B. Gonzalez. Representative Ron Paul, Chairman of the Monetary Policy Subcommittee in 2011, is known as a staunch opponent of the Federal Reserve System. He routinely introduced bills to abolish the Federal Reserve System, three of which gained approval in the House but lost in the Senate.

Congressman Paul also introduced H.R. 459: Federal Reserve Transparency Act of 2011, This act required an audit of the Federal Reserve Board and the twelve regional banks, with particular attention to the valuation of its securities. His son, Senator Rand Paul, has introduced similar legislation in subsequent sessions of Congress.

Great Depression (1929)

Milton Friedman and Anna Schwartz stated that the Fed pursued an erroneously restrictive monetary policy, exacerbating the Great Depression.  After the stock market crash in 1929, the Fed continued its contraction (decrease) of the money supply and refused to save banks that were struggling with bank runs. 
This mistake, critics charge, allowed what might have been a relatively mild recession to explode into catastrophe. Friedman and Schwartz believed that the depression was "a tragic testimonial to the importance of monetary forces."
Before the establishment of the Federal Reserve, the banking system had dealt with periodic crises (such as in the Panic of 1907) by suspending the convertibility of deposits into currency. In 1907, the system nearly collapsed and there was an extraordinary intervention by an ad-hoc coalition assembled by J. P. Morgan. In the years 1910–1913, the bankers demanded a central bank to address this structural weakness. Friedman suggested that a similar intervention should have been followed during the banking panic at the end of 1930. This might have stopped the vicious circle of forced liquidation of assets at depressed prices, just as suspension of convertibility in 1893 and 1907 had quickly ended the liquidity crises at the time.

Essentially, in the monetarist view, the Great Depression was caused by the fall of the money supply. Friedman and Schwartz note that "[f]rom the cyclical peak in August 1929 to a cyclical trough in March 1933, the stock of money fell by over a third." The result was what Friedman calls "The Great Contraction"—a period of falling income, prices, and employment caused by the choking effects of a restricted money supply. The mechanism suggested by Friedman and Schwartz was that people wanted to hold more money than the Federal Reserve was supplying. People thus hoarded money by consuming less. This, in turn, caused a contraction in employment and production, since prices were not flexible enough to immediately fall. Friedman and Schwartz argued the Federal Reserve allowed the money supply to plummet because of ineptitude and poor leadership.

Many have since agreed with this theory, including Ben Bernanke, Chairman of the Federal Reserve from 2006 until 2014, who, in a speech honoring Friedman and Schwartz, said:

Friedman has said that ideally he would prefer to "abolish the Federal Reserve and replace it with a computer." He preferred a system that would increase the money supply at some fixed rate, and he thought that "leaving monetary and banking arrangements to the market would have produced a more satisfactory outcome than was actually achieved through government involvement".

In contrast to Friedman's argument that the Fed did too little to ease after the crisis, Murray Rothbard argued that the crisis was caused by the Fed being too loose in the 1920s in the book America's Great Depression.

Global financial crisis (2007–08)

Some economists, such as John B. Taylor, have asserted that the Fed was responsible, at least partially, for the United States housing bubble which occurred prior to the 2007 recession. They claim that the Fed kept interest rates too low following the 2001 recession. The housing bubble then led to the credit crunch. Then-Chairman Alan Greenspan disputes this interpretation. He points out that the Fed's control over the long-term interest rates (to which critics refer) is only indirect. The Fed did raise the short-term interest rate over which it has control (i.e., the federal funds rate), but the long-term interest rate (which usually follows the former) did not increase.

The Federal Reserve's role as a supervisor and regulator has been criticized as being ineffective. Former U.S. Senator Chris Dodd, then-chairman of the United States Senate Committee on Banking, Housing, and Urban Affairs, remarked about the Fed's role in the 2007-2008 economic crisis, "We saw over the last number of years when they took on consumer protection responsibilities and the regulation of bank holding companies, it was an abysmal failure."

Fractional reserve banking

The Federal Reserve does not actually control the money supply directly and has delegated this authority to banks. If a bank has a reserve requirement of 10% and they have 10 million dollars in bank deposits, they can create 100 million dollars to loan out to borrowers or make other investments if it is an investment bank. It is essentially going on margin 10:1 without having to pay interest on the margin because it is money that they created themselves. This is the reason there are credit cycles or business cycles, because money supply creation is not under any single entity's control and is decentralized among many banks that are trying to do the best they can. The Federal Reserve indirectly controls this process by manipulating the Federal Funds Rate that sets the tone for interest rates on new debt throughout the economy, and intentionally puts the economy into a recession (hard landing) or slow the economy without a recession (soft landing) to tame inflation.

Republican and Tea Party criticism
During several recent elections, the Tea Party movement has made the Federal Reserve a major point of attack, which has been picked up by Republican candidates across the country. Former Congressman Ron Paul (R) of Texas and his son Senator Rand Paul (R) of Kentucky have long attacked the Fed, arguing that it is hurting the economy by devaluing the dollar. They argue that its monetary policies cause booms and busts when the Fed creates too much or too little fiat money. Ron Paul's book End the Fed repeatedly points out that the Fed engages in money creation "out of thin air." He argued that interest rates should be set by market forces, not by the Federal Reserve. Paul argues that the booms, bubbles and busts of the business cycle are caused by the Federal Reserve's actions.

In the book Paul argues that "the government and its banking cartel have together stolen $0.95 of every dollar as they have pursued a relentlessly inflationary policy." David Andolfatto of the Federal Reserve Bank of St. Louis said the statement was "just plain false" and "stupid" while noting that legitimate arguments can be made against the Federal Reserve. University of Oregon economist Mark Thoma described it as an "absurd" statement which data does not support.

Surveys of economists show overwhelming opposition to abolishing the Federal Reserve or undermining its independence. According to Princeton University economist Alan S. Blinder, "mountains of empirical evidence support the proposition that greater central bank independence produces not only less inflation but superior macroeconomic performance, e.g., lower and less volatile inflation with no more volatility in output."

Ron Paul's criticism has stemmed from the influence of the Austrian School of Economics. More specifically, economist Murray Rothbard was a vital figure in developing his views. Rothbard attempted to intertwine both political and economic arguments together in order to make a case to abolish the Federal Reserve. When first laying out his critiques, he writes "The Federal Reserve System is accountable to no one; it has no budget; it is subject to no audit; and no Congressional committee knows of...its operations." This argument from Rothbard is outdated, however, as the Federal Reserve presently does report its balance sheet weekly as well as get audited by outside third parties.

Rothbard also heavily critiques the Federal Reserve being independent from politics despite the Federal Reserve being given both private and public qualities. The acknowledgment of the Federal Reserve being a part of government that exists outside of politics inevitably becomes a "self-perpetuating oligarchy, accountable to no one."  This ignores the fact that the Federal Reserve Board of Governors is a federal agency, appointed by the president and Senate.

Private ownership or control
According to the Congressional Research Service:

According to the web site for the Federal Reserve System, the individual Federal Reserve Banks "are the operating arms of the central banking system, and they combine both public and private elements in their makeup and organization." Each of the 12 Banks has a nine-member board of directors: three elected by the commercial banks in the Bank's region, and six chosen – three each by the member banks and the Board of Governors – "to represent the public with due consideration to the interests of agriculture, commerce, industry, services, labor and consumers." These regional banks are in turn controlled by the Federal Reserve Board of Governors, whose seven members are nominated by the president of the United States and confirmed by the Senate.

Member banks ("about 38 percent of the nation's more than 8,000 banks") are required to own capital stock in their regional banks. Until 2016, the regional banks paid a set 6% dividend on the member banks' paid-in capital stock (not the regional banks' profits) each year, returning the rest to the US Treasury Department. As of February 24, 2016, member banks with more than $10 billion in assets receive an annual dividend on their paid-in capital stock (Reserve Bank stock) of the lesser of 6% percent and the highest yield of the 10-year Treasury note auctioned at the last auction held prior to the payment of the dividend. Member banks with $10 billion or less in assets continue to be paid a set 6% annual dividend. This change was implemented during the Obama Administration in order "to 
implement the provisions of section 32203 of the Fixing America's Surface Transportation Act (FAST Act)". The Fed has noted that this has created "some confusion about 'ownership'":

In his textbook, Monetary Policy and the Financial System, Paul M. Horvitz, the former Director of Research for the Federal Deposit Insurance Corporation, stated,

In the American Political Science Review, Michael D. Reagan wrote,

Transparency issues
One critique is that the Federal Open Market Committee, which is part of the Federal Reserve System, lacks transparency and is not sufficiently audited. A report by Bloomberg News asserts that the majority of Americans believes that the System should be held more accountable or that it should be abolished. Another critique is the contention that the public should have a right to know what goes on in the Federal Open Market Committee (FOMC) meetings.

See also

 America's Great Depression
 Black Friday (1869) Covers the gold scandal of 1869
 The Case Against the Fed
 Causes of the Great Depression
 Criticism of the United States government#Criticism of agencies
 End the Fed
 Federal Reserve Police
 Fractional reserve banking
 Free banking
 Gold standard
 Great Contraction
 Murray Rothbard

References

External links
 New monetary target, Financial Times (registration required)
 The Case Against the Fed PDF book by Murray Rothbard
 The Creature from Jekyll Island PDF book by G. Edward Griffin 
 End the Fed PDF book by Ron Paul

Federal Reserve
Federal Reserve System
Great Depression
Monetary policy of the United States
Monetary reform
Federal Reserve